Aerangis articulata is a species of epiphytic orchid. It is native to Madagascar and the Comoro Islands.

References

articulata
Flora of Madagascar
Flora of the Comoros
Epiphytic orchids
Plants described in 1872